Maximiliano Agustín "Maxi" Villa Pereira (born 3 March 1997) is an Uruguayan footballer who plays for Spanish club Girona FC as either a central defender or a right back.

Club career
Born in Montevideo, Villa finished his formation with Nacional. On 14 July 2017, he was loaned to Girona FC for one year and was immediately assigned to the reserves in Segunda División B.

Villa made his senior debut on 20 August 2017, starting in a 0–1 home loss against RCD Mallorca. He scored his first goal on 22 October, netting the second in a 2–0 home defeat of SCR Peña Deportiva.

Villa made his first team debut for the Catalans on 28 November 2017, starting in a 1–1 away draw against Levante UD, for the season's Copa del Rey. It was his only appearance with the main squad, and he returned to his parent club when his loan ended in July 2018.

On 30 January 2019, Villa returned to Girona and its B-side, signing a permanent 18-month contract. On 16 August, he moved to Segunda División side SD Ponferradina on loan for one year.

On 21 September 2020, after featuring rarely, Villa joined Villarreal CF B in the third division on loan for the season.

References

External links

1997 births
Living people
Footballers from Montevideo
Uruguayan footballers
Association football defenders
Club Nacional de Football players
Segunda División players
Segunda División B players
CF Peralada players
Girona FC players
SD Ponferradina players
Villarreal CF B players
Uruguayan expatriate footballers
Uruguayan expatriate sportspeople in Spain
Expatriate footballers in Spain